USS Knox may refer to the following ships of the United States Navy:
 
 , was a  launched 17 July 1943 and sold in 1947
 , was a  launched 19 November 1966 and sunk as a target in 2007
 , was a  launched 17 September 1944 and transferred to Greece in 1971

United States Navy ship names